Seventeen men have served as the president of the University of Florida since the modern university was created from the consolidation of four predecessor institutions by the Florida state legislature in 1905.

The University of Florida is a public university, created and supported by the State of Florida. The primary campus of the university is located in Gainesville, and it has academic, agricultural, medical and other research facilities in Jacksonville, Orlando, and throughout Florida. The university traces its origins to 1853, the founding date of the East Florida Seminary in Ocala, Florida, the oldest of the university's four predecessor institutions. Following the 1905 merger of its predecessor institutions, the newly consolidated men's university and land-grant college was first known as the "University of the State of Florida." The name was officially shortened to the "University of Florida" in 1909.

The University of Florida is one of sixty-two member institutions of the Association of American Universities (AAU), the association of preeminent North American research universities, and the only AAU member university in Florida. Following the creation of performance standards by the Florida state legislature in 2013, the Florida Board of Governors designated the University of Florida as one of two "preeminent universities" among the twelve universities of the State University System of Florida.

To date, the youngest president of the University of Florida has been Andrew Sledd, who facilitated the organization of the new university from the consolidation of its predecessor institutions in 1905. When the Florida Board of Control appointed Sledd as the first president of the new state university on June 7, 1905, he was five months short of his thirty-fifth birthday. The longest-serving president of the university was John J. Tigert, who held the office for nineteen years from 1928 to 1947. The first university faculty member to become its permanent president was J. Wayne Reitz in 1955, and the first university alumnus to become its president was Stephen C. O'Connell in 1967.

The former president of the University of Florida is W. Kent Fuchs. Fuchs replaced Bernard Machen on January 1, 2015. Using the university's counting method (acting or "interim" presidents are not numbered), Fuchs is the twelfth president of the university. Eleven men have served as the university's permanent president, and five have served as its interim, or acting, president pending the appointment of a permanent successor. The current president of the University of Florida is Ben Sasse.

List of presidents

Timeline of University of Florida presidential terms

See also 

 Florida Gators
 History of the University of Florida
 List of University of Florida alumni
 List of University of Florida faculty and administrators
 List of University of Florida honorary degree recipients

References

Bibliography 

Armstrong, Orland Kay,  The Life and Work of Dr. A.A. Murphree, The Record Company, St. Augustine, Florida (1928).
Barnett, Albert E., Andrew Sledd: His Life and Work, Candler School of Theology, Emory University, Atlanta, Georgia (1956).
Farr, James M., The Making of a University (unpublished manuscript), University of Florida, George A. Smathers Libraries, Special Collections, Gainesville, Florida (c. 1935–1941).
Osborn, George Coleman, John James Tigert: American Educator, The University Presses of Florida, Gainesville, Florida (1974).
Pleasants, Julian M., Gator Tales: An Oral History of the University of Florida, University of Florida, Gainesville, Florida (2006). 
Proctor, Samuel, & Wright Langley, Gator History: A Pictorial History of the University of Florida, South Star Publishing Company, Gainesville, Florida (1986). .
Van Ness, Carl, & Kevin McCarthy, Honoring the Past, Shaping the Future: The University of Florida, 1853–2003, University of Florida, Gainesville, Florida (2003).

External links 

  Past Presidents – Official website of the University of Florida, Office of the President.

Florida, University of
University of Florida presidents
Presidents